Nationality words link to articles with information on the nation's poetry or literature (for instance, Irish or France).

Events
 July – A new edition of Bernard Mandeville's The Fable of the Bees is presented as a public nuisance by the Grand Jury of Middlesex, England, to the Court of King's Bench. Mandeville escapes prosecution.

Works published in English

English colonies in America
 Samuel Keimer, Elegy on the Much Lamented Death of [. . .] Aquila Rose, a verse memorial memorable for having been set in type by Benjamin Franklin, then an employee of Keimer, a printer in Philadelphia
 Francis Knapp, attributed, Gloria Britannorum; or, The British Worthies
 Edward Taylor, A Funerall Teare [. . .] an elegy on Increase Mather

Great Britain
 Henry Baker, An Invocation of Health: a poem
 Sir Richard Blackmore, Alfred: An epick poem
 Ambrose Philips, Ode on the Death of William, Earl Cowper
 Matthew Prior:
 Down-Hall
 The Turtle and the Sparrow
 Allan Ramsay, The Fair Assembly
 Ned Ward, Nuptial Dialogues and Debates, 3rd ed.

Works published in other languages
 Heyat Mahmud, Jangnama; Bengali
 Jean-Baptiste Rousseau, Ode et Cantates, first published in London; French

Births
Death years link to the corresponding "[year] in poetry" article:
 January 27 – Johann Andreas Cramer (died 1788), German poet, writer and theologian
 September 30 – William Hutton (died 1815), English local historian and poet
 November 3 – Samuel Davies (died 1761), English Colonial American Presbyterian clergyman, president of Princeton College, author and poet
 November 30 – William Livingston (died 1790), English Colonial American public official, poet and writer

Deaths

Death years link to the corresponding "[year] in poetry" article:
 February 13 – Sarah Fyge Egerton (born 1668), English poet
 February 26 – Thomas d'Urfey (born 1653), English writer of plays, songs, poetry and jokes
 March 13 – René Auguste Constantin de Renneville (born 1650), French Protestant poet and historian
 March 15 – Johann Christian Günther, German poet (born 1695)
 June 8 – Isaac Chayyim Cantarini (born 1644), Italian poet, writer, physician, rabbi and preacher
 September 23 – Jacques Basnage (born 1653), French Protestant poet, linguist and preacher

See also
 Poetry
 List of years in poetry

 List of years in literature
 18th century in poetry
 18th century in literature
 Augustan poetry
 Scriblerus Club

Notes

 "A Timeline of English Poetry" Web page of the Representative Poetry Online Web site, University of Toronto

18th-century poetry
Poetry